Norman bin Musa (born 20 November 1974) is a Malaysian born chef, author, TV host, tutor, restaurateur and entrepreneur, based in The Hague, The Netherlands. Born in Butterworth, Penang in Malaysia, he was the co-founder of Ning restaurant in Manchester and Executive Chef of Wah Nam Hong Restaurant in The Hague, The Netherlands and author of the Amazing Malaysian cookbook.

Life, career and awards
Norman Musa is a Malaysian Malay, raised by his parents in a kampung called Sungai Nyior in Butterworth. Following his secondary education, he earned a scholarship to study quantity surveying at the University of Portsmouth beginning in1994. After graduation in 1997, his first job as a quantity surveyor was in Bournemouth, Southern England before relocating to London in 1999. In 2003, he moved to Manchester where he continued to practice as a quantity surveyor.

In 2006, Musa took a break as a quantity surveyor to plan, design, and develop a restaurant with his partner at the time. The restaurant, Ning, opened for business in December 2006 and was located in the Northern Quarter. The menu centered on Malaysian and Thai cuisine. Norman worked as Head Chef at the restaurant for the first year, then returned to his role as a quantity surveyor. Once the restaurant business took off in 2009, he left his career in quantity surveying to work full-time at Ning. A second Ning restaurant opened in York and was in business from 2012 to 2014.

Norman Musa has received various awards and acknowledgements since 2013, beginning with the Hospitality Guild's Young Hall of Fame award, which he received at a parliamentary reception at the House of Commons. He was also acknowledged as runner up for the Asian & Oriental Chef of the Year category at the Asian Curry Awards in 2013.

In November 2014, the Kuala Lumpur Mayor's office issued a press release announcing Musa's appointment as the Kuala Lumpur Food Ambassador for the European market.

In April 2016, Musa was shortlisted as one of the seven Malaysian cooks who made it abroad by the Malaysian Newspaper, The Star.

In March 2017, Musa was handed a five-year disqualification for employing illegal workers at Ning. The disqualification follows an investigation by the Insolvency Service, which found that Musa failed to ensure the business completed relevant immigration checks on its employees resulting in the employment of two illegal workers.

In March 2018, Musa was offered to teach at Seasoned Cookery School Derbyshire increasing the list of cookery schools in his profile.

In May 2018, Musa was offered to run five day cooking demonstrations and masterclasses at one of the biggest Festivals in Europe, the Tong Tong Fair held in The Hague, The Netherlands. The 12 day festival was attended by more than 80,000 visitors from 24 May to 3 June 2018. Musa was also commissioned to create a Malaysian inspired breakfast for the Mercure Hotel in The Hague to be served during the festival. 

On 25 June 2018, Musa was invited to teach at the Foodworks Cookery School in Cheltenham 
On 4 July 2018 Musa released his open letter statement on his social media and website to his followers in regard to the illegal workers incident and the consequences.

On 22 January 2019, Musa was officially appointed as the Executive Chef for Wah Nam Hong Restaurant in Leidsenhage, The Netherlands.

Musa filmed his third cooking show East West Bake in Cheshire, United Kingdom from 11 March 2019 until 17 March 2019. Musa co-hosted the show with his mentor, Chef Brian Mellor. The show is for the Malaysian TV Channel 'Saluran Okey'.

On 18 March, Musa was invited to run a cooking demonstration to promote Malaysian fruits at the Unesco Headquarters in Paris. The event was launched by the Deputy Malaysian Prime Minister, Dato Sri Dr Wan Azizah. Musa invited the Deputy Prime Minister to cook alongside him during the event.

He is actively promoting Malaysian cuisine in The Netherlands by running cooking demonstrations and workshops. 

In March 2019, Musa was announced by Holland-based Big Green Egg as one of the celebrity chefs who will run a cooking workshop at their annual Big Green Egg's Flavour Fair (16 June, 2019) in Lisse, The Netherlands. His popular workshops sold out a few weeks in advance of the event. 

Norman was asked by his Dutch celebrity chef friend, Francis Kuijk to write the foreword for her second Dutch cookbook Basisboek Indonesisch, that was published in March 2019. 

Article of Musa and his recipes were featured in the Malaysian's Her World magazine April 2019 Issue.  

His recipes for the new Dutch cookbook Magisch Maleisisch were featured in the Elle Eten magazine for the May 2019 issue.

Norman launched his Dutch cookbook Magisch Maleisich, the translation of his Amazing Malaysian cookbook on 4 June 2019 at Keizer Culinair in Amsterdam. The book was published by Podium Uitgever, the Amsterdam-based publisher.

On 22 and 23 June 2019, Norman was invited by the Malaysian Embassy in The Hague to run cooking demonstrations for the Malaysian Food Fair.

On 24 July 2019 Norman's laksa dish was mentioned in the article of The Guardian, UK top newspaper written by Felicity Cloake. The article compared the laksa recipes amongst other Malaysian chefs. 'Where the recipes diverge, however, is in their use of dried spices. Malaysian chef Norman Musa uses sweeter aromatics such as star anise and cinnamon along with the coriander seeds and turmeric found in Tan's version, as well as that from Mandy Yin, the Kuala-Lumpur-born chef at my favourite laksa joint, north London's Sambal Shiok. In fact, Musa uses the most spices of all, also adding cumin, black peppercorns and cardamom to the paste – his laksa is delicious, more savoury and complex to my and my testers’ minds than some of the others, but doesn't quite hit the classic, comfortingly creamy notes we like so much in Yin's. For a less rich take, however, I'd highly recommend it.'

His work in promoting Malaysian cuisine in the United Kingdom and Europe has prompted the Malaysian Ministry of Education to write an inspirational article about his career for Malay Language Standard 6 School Text book, for students age 12+. The book is available for all primary schools in Malaysia.

Two of his recipes from Amazing Malaysian cookbook were selected by Josh Emett, the New Zealand-based celebrity chef, to be included in his cookbook The Recipe, the book comprises more than 300 modern classic recipes from 150 of the world's finest chefs and cooks. The book was published in May 2019.  

His cooking show East West Bake, a 13-episode cooking show that was filmed in March 2019 with his co-host and mentor, Chef Brian Mellor, in Chester, United Kingdom. The program aired on Malaysian TV Okey, starting on 9 January 2020. 

In February 2020, Norman filmed his fifth cooking show Explore the Scent Holland for Malaysian TV. This 13-episode show featured Musa with his Dutch celebrity chef friends. The show captured local Dutch attractions and co-hosts showcased Dutch cuisine, while Musa prepared Malaysian cuisine. The show aired on Malaysian TV and is available for online streaming as of October 2020.

In May 2020, he teamed up with seven other globally based Malaysian-born chefs to establish, Masters of Malaysian Cuisine—a campaign to promote Malaysian food through live online cooking demonstrations in partnership with Tourism Malaysia and the Ministry of Agriculture and Food Industries.

From 25 September to 4 October 2020, Norman introduced the Dutch market to the Malaysian food brand Adabi through Wah Nam Hong Supermarket, during a campaign organised by the Ministry of Agriculture and Food Industries Malaysia to promote Malaysian fruits and products. 

In October 2020, Norman with his Sydney based chef colleague, Jackie M., and London based Nutritionist, Kerry Torrens, launched the S.E.A. Food Revolution’ online campaign and workshop series, to inspire people to cook healthy South-east Asian dishes and promote a healthy dietary approach.  

On 20 October 2020 Norman was invited to be a speaker for the online Webinar organised by Malaysia-based Taylor's University with the topic, Future Chef: Developing Adaptability Skills.

In December 2020, he was appointed as the Adjunct Senior Lecturer by Malaysian-based Taylor's University. This two-year contract commenced on 1 January 2021 and entails producing online lectures and organising student events.

References

Living people
1974 births
Malaysian chefs